Halloween Spooktacular is an annual Halloween event that takes place at SeaWorld Orlando just outside of Orlando, Florida, SeaWorld San Antonio in San Antonio, Texas and SeaWorld San Diego in San Diego, California. The event debuted in 2008 at the Orlando, San Diego and San Antonio parks. It was suspended for several years at the San Antonio park and was reintroduced in 2016. The event is specifically designed for children and includes trick-or-treating for all guests.

Locations
Halloween Spooktacular is run inside the  SeaWorld Orlando park, the  SeaWorld San Antonio park, and the  SeaWorld San Diego park.

Event
Halloween Spooktacular generally features attractions such as special Sesame Street shows, trick-or-treating, party zones, face painting, hayrides and other strolling park entertainment such as costumed characters.

See also
 Howl-O-Scream, an event held at SeaWorld San Antonio and other parks owned by SeaWorld Parks & Entertainment
 Haunted attraction (simulated)

References

External links
 Official website
 Halloween Spooktacular Photo Gallery

Halloween events in the United States
Recurring events established in 2008